Su-bin, also spelled Soo-bin, is a Korean unisex given name. In 2008, Su-bin was the 9th-most-popular given name for baby girls in South Korea, with 2,069 being given the name.

Hanja and meaning
The meaning of the name Su-bin differs based on the hanja used to write each syllable of the name. There are 67 hanja with the reading "su" and 25 hanja with the reading "bin" on the South Korean government's official list of hanja which may be used in given names.  Some ways of writing this name in hanja include:

: "outstanding and refined"

Historically, Su-bin was a title for concubines of the first rank during the Joseon dynasty, for example King Jeongjo's concubine Su-bin Bak (1770–1822). Such titles can be distinguished from the given name because they are placed before the surname rather than after it.

People
People with this name include:

Entertainers
Bae Soo-bin (born 1976), South Korean male actor 
Chae Soo-bin (born 1994), South Korean actress
Park Subin (born 1994), South Korean female singer, member of Dal Shabet
Yang Soobin (born 1994), South Korean female entertainer known for her eating shows

Sportspeople
Choi Su-bin (born 1988), South Korean male football player
Jung Soo-bin (born 1990), South Korean male baseball player

Other
Lee Soo-bin (born 1939), South Korean businessman, CEO of Samsung Life Insurance since 2008
Soovin Kim (born 1976), American male violinist of Korean descent

See also
List of Korean given names
Chua Soo Bin (born 1932), Singaporean photographer

References

Korean unisex given names